Rishta Kagaz Ka is a 1983 Indian Hindi-language romance film produced and directed by Ajay Goel. It stars Raj Babbar and Rati Agnihotri in lead roles.

Plot
Suman sacrifices a lot and cares for her adoptive brother Arun when his parents and brother Bunty pass away. Arun grows up to be an engineer but his marriage makes his relationship with Suman suffer.

Cast
 Raj Babbar as Arun Sharma
 Rati Agnihotri as Aarti A. Sharma
 Nutan as Suman Sharma
 Suresh Oberoi as Dr. Ravi Kaul
 Iftekhar as Bhatnagar
 Urmila Bhatt as Mrs. Kaul
 Jagdish Raj as Aarti's dad
 Neeta Mehta as Roopa

Soundtrack

References

External links

1980s Hindi-language films
1983 films
Films scored by Rajesh Roshan
Hindi films remade in other languages
Indian romantic drama films